The Ghost Dub-Dime is a retail and the 10th mixtape by rapper Styles P. It was released on 18 May 2010 via E1 Entertainment. Featured guest appearances are from Tre Williams, Jimi Kendrix & Tyler Woods. Production duties are handled by Tyler Woods, Street Radio, Caesar Productions and Don Joe for Dogozilla Productions.

Track listing

References

2010 mixtape albums
Styles P albums